Russell Adams may refer to:

 Russell H. Adams (1899–1956), Allegheny County District Attorney, 1942–1945
 Russell L. Adams (born 1930), American author and professor